Madhuban Assembly constituency is an assembly constituency in Purvi Champaran district in the Indian state of Bihar. It is located 11 km north west district entry point Kaswa Mehsi and Mehsi railway station in Mehsi City, 34 km Northeast of headquarters in Motihari.

Overview
As per orders of Delimitation of Parliamentary and Assembly constituencies Order, 2008, 18. Madhuban Assembly constituency is composed of the following:
Madhuban, Pakridayal and Phenhara community development blocks.

Madhuban Assembly constituency is part of 4. Sheohar (Lok Sabha constituency).

Members of Legislative Assembly

Election results

2020

References

External links
 

Assembly constituencies of Bihar
Politics of East Champaran district